Mount Julian may refer to:

Places
 Mount Julian, Queensland, Australia
 Mount Julian, Ontario, Canada

Mountains
 Mount Julian (Alberta), Canada
 Mount Julian (Colorado), United States